Sainte-Agathe-d'Aliermont is a commune in the Seine-Maritime department in the Normandy region in northern France.

Geography

Population

Places of interest
 The chapel of St. Charles at Beauval.
 The church of St. Agathe, dating from the thirteenth century.

See also
Communes of the Seine-Maritime department

References

Communes of Seine-Maritime